Aphaenogaster uinta is a species of ant in the family Formicidae.

References

 Hansson C, Lachaud J, Pérez-Lachaud G (2011). "Entedoninae wasps (Hymenoptera, Chalcidoidea, Eulophidae) associated with ants (Hymenoptera, Formicidae) in tropical America, with new species and notes on their biology". ZooKeys 134: 62–82.

Further reading

 Arnett, Ross H. (2000). American Insects: A Handbook of the Insects of America North of Mexico. CRC Press.

uinta
Insects described in 1917